This article details the Wakefield Trinity Wildcats rugby league football club's 2016 season.

Table

To be inserted.

2016 fixtures and results

2016 Super League Fixtures

2016 Super 8's

2016 Play-offs

Player appearances
Super League Only

 = Injured

 = Suspended

Challenge Cup

Player appearances
Challenge Cup Games only

2016 squad statistics

 Appearances and points include (Super League, Challenge Cup and play-offs) as of 24 April 2016.

 = Injured
 = Suspended

2016 transfers in/out

In

Out

References

External links
Wakefield Wildcats Website
Wakefield Wildcats - SL Website

Wakefield Trinity seasons
Super League XXI by club